Samuel Hulse Preston (born December 2, 1943) is an American demographer and sociologist.

He is one of the leading demographers in the United States. He received his Ph.D. in economics from Princeton University in 1968. Preston is a professor emeritus at the University of Pennsylvania in Philadelphia, Pennsylvania. He is the former dean of the School of Arts and Sciences at the University of Pennsylvania, as well as a member of the National Academy of Sciences since 1987. He was elected to the American Academy of Arts and Sciences in 1986 and the American Philosophical Society in 1992.

The Preston curve is named after him. Preston's major research interest is in the health of populations. He has written primarily about mortality trends and patterns in large aggregates, including 20th-century mortality transitions and black/white differentials in the United States.

Publications

References

External links
Samuel H. Preston, at the University of Pennsylvania

American sociologists
American demographers
University of Pennsylvania faculty
Fellows of the American Statistical Association
1943 births
Living people
Members of the United States National Academy of Sciences
Members of the American Philosophical Society
Members of the National Academy of Medicine